Geneviève Beauchesne-Sevigny (born April 23, 1986 in Montreal, Quebec) is a Canadian sprint canoer who competed in the late 2000s. At the 2008 Summer Olympics in Beijing, she was eliminated in the semifinals of the K-4 500 m event.

She is a sister of Gabriel Beauchesne-Sévigny.

References
 

1986 births
Canoeists from Montreal
Canadian female canoeists
Canoeists at the 2008 Summer Olympics
Living people
Olympic canoeists of Canada